Sippy Pallippuram is an Indian writer of children's literature in Malayalam who has won several awards including Kendra Sahitya Akademi Award and Kerala Sahitya Akademi Award. His novel about the memories of Kunjunni Mash Oridathoru Kunjunni won the national award for children's literature by Kendra Sahitya Akademi. His book Unnikalkku Noottiyettu Gurudeva Kathakal received the Kerala Sahitya Akademi Award for Children's Literature in 2013. A teacher by profession, he has over 80 (as of 2008) poetries and stories to his credit in the children's category of Malayalam literature. Sippy has been into children's literature for more than four decades.

He is a native of Pallippuram, Vypeen, Ernakulam, Kerala, and was born on 18 May 1943
in a Keralan Latin Catholic family and belongs to the Diocese of Kottapuram.

List of awards Sippy has received over the years

References

1943 births
Indian male novelists
Malayalam novelists
Malayalam-language writers
Living people
Indian children's writers
Recipients of the Kerala Sahitya Akademi Award
20th-century Indian novelists
Writers from Kochi
21st-century Indian novelists
Novelists from Kerala
20th-century Indian male writers
21st-century Indian male writers